Lias Andersson (born 13 October 1998) is a Swedish professional ice hockey forward for the Ontario Reign in the American Hockey League (AHL) while under contract to the Los Angeles Kings of the National Hockey League (NHL). He was selected by the New York Rangers, seventh overall, in the 2017 NHL Entry Draft. Andersson's father Niklas played 763 SHL games and 165 NHL games, and his uncle Mikael played 761 NHL games.

Playing career
Andersson made his Swedish Hockey League debut with HV71 during the 2015–16 season. In the following 2016–17 season, able to accept a larger role, Andersson appeared in 42 games in the regular season, contributing with 9 goals and 19 points. He appeared in every post-season game in compiling 4 goals and 5 point in 16 games to help HV71 capture their fifth Le Mat Trophy.

On 8 May 2017, Andersson opted to leave HV71 and agreed to a two-year contract to link up with Frölunda HC. It marked a return in continuing his heritage, as he spent his childhood with the club, as his father gained an icon status during his tenure with Frölunda. Following his selection to the Rangers, Andersson was signed to a three-year, entry-level contract on 14 July 2017.

In the 2017–18 season, Andersson made his debut with Frölunda HC and appeared in 22 games, registering 7 goals and 14 points, before leaving the club to attend his second World Junior Championships. Following the conclusion of the tournament, Andersson left the SHL and was re-assigned by the Rangers to make his North American debut in joining AHL affiliate, the Hartford Wolf Pack on 19 January 2018. On 25 March 2018 Andersson was called up to the NHL and made his NHL debut against the Washington Capitals at Madison Square Garden the next day. He scored his first career NHL goal in his debut, making him the youngest Rangers player to score a goal in their debut, surpassing Mike Allison. Andersson was sent back to the AHL on 7 April.

Andersson began the 2018–19 season in the American Hockey League after being cut from the Rangers 2018 training camp. After recording 12 points in 14 games for the Hartford Wolf Pack, Andersson was recalled to the NHL on 5 November.

On 21 December 2019, it was reported by Darren Dreger that Andersson had formally asked the New York Rangers for a trade. However, on 26 January 2020, it was announced that the Rangers had loaned Andersson to HV71 of the Swedish Hockey League.

On 7 October 2020, Andersson's tenure with the Rangers ended as he was dealt to the Los Angeles Kings in exchange for Vegas' second-round pick in 2020.

International play

Andersson was named to Team Sweden for the 2016 IIHF World U18 Championships and helped Sweden win silver by putting up nine points in seven games. He was again named to Team Sweden for the 2017 World Junior Ice Hockey Championships, where he scored three goals. He was named captain to Team Sweden for the 2018 World Junior Ice Hockey Championships, where he helped guide the team to a silver medal, and in a controversial display, threw it into the crowd in frustration. For this action, he was suspended from four games during the 2019 World Junior Ice Hockey Championships.

In April 2018, he was named to Sweden's 2018 IIHF World Championship team, and Sweden won gold.

Career statistics

Regular season and playoffs

International

Awards and honors

References

External links

 

1998 births
Living people
Frölunda HC players
Hartford Wolf Pack players
HV71 players
Los Angeles Kings players
National Hockey League first-round draft picks
New York Rangers draft picks
New York Rangers players
Ontario Reign (AHL) players
People from Sotenäs Municipality
Swedish ice hockey centres
Sportspeople from Västra Götaland County
Swedish expatriate ice hockey players in the United States